The Institute of Modern Languages (IML) is an institute of the University of Dhaka in Bangladesh dedicated to teaching various modern languages including Bengali, English, French, German, Russian, Spanish, Italian, Arabic, Persian, Turkish, Mandarin Chinese, Japanese, Korean, and Hindi. Four levels of certificate courses are offered for each language, Bengali being the only language exclusively reserved for foreign international students. B.A Honours programs in English, French, Mandarin Chinese and Japanese have been recently added to the curriculum, where an additional Masters program was added to the English curriculum. For junior courses, a student must obtain at least G.P.A. 2.5 in higher secondary exam. For upper certificate courses, he must pass admission test. Anyone passing DU admission test from B or D unit will be eligible to enroll for honours courses.

History
In 1948, the Department of International Relations was established at the University of Dhaka, where courses for Chinese and French were introduced the next year. The year after the Language Movement of 1952, German was added to the courses. In 1964 these courses were separated from International Relations, and a Department of Foreign Languages was established. Russian and Turkish were introduced in the next year, and Japanese in 1972. In 1973 Spanish was introduced to bring the total number of languages taught to six.

On the first of July 1974 the Institute of Modern Languages was established as an integral part of University of Dhaka, incorporating the Department of Foreign Languages of 1964 into its constitution.

In recent years the number of students has been declining. However the Korean language department was expanded in 2014.

References

External links
Official site

University of Dhaka
1948 establishments in East Pakistan
Linguistic research institutes
Research institutes in Bangladesh